Union Sportive Forezienne is a French association football club founded in 1945. They are based in the town of Feurs and their home stadium is the Stade Rousson. As of the 2022–23 season, they play in Championnat National 3, the fifth tier of French football, after winning promotion in 2022.

References

External links
US Feurs official website 
US Feurs official blog

1945 establishments in France
Association football clubs established in 1945
Sport in Loire (department)
Football clubs in Auvergne-Rhône-Alpes